Sebastian Manz (born 1986) is a German clarinetist.

Life and work
Sebastian Manz was born in Hanover and son of pianist Wolfgang Manz and Julia Goldstein and grandson of the Russian violinist Boris Goldstein, began studying clarinet at Musikhochschule Lübeck in 1997.

He won first place in Jugend musiziert in 1994 and 1999–2003. He was the first clarinetist in 40 years to win first prize in the ARD International Music Competition in Munich in 2008. In the same year, Manz and his partner on piano Martin Klett as "Duo Riul" won the first prize in of the German national competition Deutscher Musikwettbewerb.

Sebastian Manz was the recipient in 2012 of yet another ECHO Klassik award, this time in the "Chamber Music Recording of the Year" category, for his recording of the Mozart and Beethoven quintets together with Ramón Ortega Quero, Marc Trénel, David Alonso and Herbert Schuch. Just one year earlier, he received the coveted award in the "Newcomer of the Year" category for his excellent recording of Mozart's Clarinet Concerto.

He studied under Sabine Meyer and Rainer Wehle. In his debut at the Tonhalle Zürich on 4 May 2010 he played Mozart's Clarinet Concerto with the Nordwestdeutsche Philharmonie conducted by their designated chief conductor Eugene Tzigane. Manz performed with Bavarian Radio Symphony Orchestra, Germany, and Collegium Musicum Basel, Switzerland. Since 2010, he is soloist in the Stuttgart Radio Symphony Orchestra.

Discography
 In Rhythm. Works by Gerswhin, Reich, Piazzolla, Copland, Templeton, Villa-Lobos, Bernstein und Milhaud (Sebastian Manz, clarinet; Martin Klett, piano) Label:CAvi
 Mozart – Glière – Korngold. Sebastian Manz with Mozart’s clarinet concerto in A major, K 622. Symphonic orchestra of Bayerischer Rundfunk, Cornelius Meister. Label: BR Klassik
 Gottfried Hendrik Mann (1858–1904). Clarinet Concerto op. 90. Feest Prelude op. 95. Violin Concerto op.101. Suite no. 3 op. 98. (Sebastian Manz, clarinet; Akiko Amada, violin; Symphonieorchester Osnabrück, conductor: Hermann Bäumer) Label: cpo
 Christian Wilhelm Westerhoff (1763–1806). Clarinet Concerto op. 5. Concerto for Clarinet, Bassoon & Orchestra. Symphony in E flat major. (Sebastian Manz, clarinet; Albrecht Holder, bassoon; Symphonieorchester Osnabrück, conductor: Hermann Bäumer) Label: cpo
 Die Quintette von Mozart und Beethoven für Klavier und Bläser. Mozart: Quintett Es-Dur KV. 452 for piano, oboe, clarinet, horn and fagott. Beethoven: Quintett Es-Dur op. 16 for piano, oboe, clarinet, horn and fagott. Label: Indésens
 DUO RIUL. Works by Brahms, Berg, Debussy, Lutoslawski, Yun (Sebastian Manz, clarinet; Martin Klett, piano) Label: GENUIN
 Clarinet Concertos – Nielsen & Lindberg. Nielsen: Serenata in vano, CNW 69. Clarinet Concerto, Op. 57. Lindberg: Clarinet Concerto. (Sebastian Manz, clarinette; Deutsche Radio Philharmonie, conductors: Dominik Beykirch & Magnus Lindberg) Label: Berlin Classics.

Awards
 First prize ARD International Music Competition, 2008
 Prize of Deutscher Musikwettbewerb, 2008: Duo clarinet/piano
 ECHO Klassik award 2011 in the category "Newcomer of the Year"
 ECHO Klassik award 2012 in the category "Chamber Music Recording of the Year"

References

External links
 

1986 births
German clarinetists
Living people
21st-century clarinetists